Carina Horn (born 9 March 1989) is a South African sprinter. She competed in the 60 metres at the 2014 IAAF World Indoor Championships reaching the semifinals.

International competitions

Personal bests
Outdoor
100 metres – 10.98 (1.5 m/s, Doha 2018) NR
200 metres – 23.43 (Réduit 2011)
Indoor
60 metres – 7.09 (Metz 2018)

Doping violation
On 13 September 2019 she was provisionally suspended from competition for violating anti-doping rules.  The notice of allegation issued noted the presence of Ibutamoren and Ligandrol (LGD-4033).

References

External links
 

1989 births
Living people
South African female sprinters
Sportspeople from Durban
World Athletics Championships athletes for South Africa
Athletes (track and field) at the 2016 Summer Olympics
Olympic athletes of South Africa
South African Athletics Championships winners
Olympic female sprinters
20th-century South African women
21st-century South African women